The Turkish Waterpolo League has been contested since 1942. The current champion is Enkaspor Waterpolo Team, from Istanbul.

Teams 2021/22

Champions

Champions by year

External links
 Turkish Water Polo Federation Official Website

 

Water polo competitions in Turkey
Turkey